Dink or DINK may refer to:

Places
 Dink, Plovdiv Province, a village in Bulgaria
 Dink, West Virginia, an unincorporated community in the United States
 Dink Island, Palmer Archipelago, Antarctica

Entertainment

Characters 
 Dink Meeker, in the Ender's Game series of books by Orson Scott Card
 "Dink" Dunkin, a child detective in the A to Z Mysteries novel series
 Dink Stover, in stories and novels by Owen Johnson
 Dink, a child character in the 1931 film The Champ, played by Jackie Cooper
 Dink, in the 1953 film The Clown, a remake of The Champ
 Dink (James Bond), a woman in the James Bond film Goldfinger
 Dinks, a group of munchkin-like characters in red robes in the 1987 movie Spaceballs
 Dink Jenkins, in the 2000 film My Dog Skip, played by Luke Wilson
 Bud Dink, on the Nickelodeon and Disney television series Doug
 the title character of Dink, the Little Dinosaur, a 1980s American children's animated series
 Dink, a recurring character in the TV series Private Practice
 Dink, in the animated TV series Cubeez
 the main character of Dink Smallwood, a role-playing video game made in 1997

Other
 Dink (band), an American industrial rock band
 "D.I.N.K", a season 2 episode of Sanjay and Craig

People
 Dink (nickname)
 Arat Dink (born 1979), Turkish journalist
 Hrant Dink (1954–2007), Turkish-Armenian editor and journalist
 Claude Giroux (wrestler) (born 1956), midget wrestler who used the ring name Dink

Slang
 DINK (acronym) or "Dual Income, No Kids", a couple living together with no kids
 Beanie (seamed cap), occasionally known as a "dink" in the context of American college hazing
In first-person shooter games, a headshot that does not kill the player
 Dinks was one of the derogatory terms used to refer to the Viet Cong or NVA.

Sports
 In footvolley, hitting the ball over the net with one's head
 In pickleball, a soft shot made by a player while near their own non-volley zone, into their opponent's non-volley zone
 In soccer, chipping the ball lightly
 In tennis, a soft drop shot
 In volleyball, tapping the ball just barely over the net after faking a spike

See also
 Dinker (disambiguation)
 Dinking (disambiguation)
 Dinky (disambiguation)
 Rinky Dink (disambiguation)

Turkish-language surnames